Harbinger is an unincorporated community in Currituck County, North Carolina, United States. The community is located along U.S. Highway 158 near the southern tip of the peninsula which forms mainland Currituck County. Harbinger has a post office with ZIP code 27941.

Geography

Climate

This region experiences hot and wet summers with rainy days. According to the Köppen Climate Classification system, Harbinger has a humid subtropical climate (Köppen Cfa).

There are cool winters during which intense rainfall can occur in nor'easters.

References

Unincorporated communities in Currituck County, North Carolina
Unincorporated communities in North Carolina